Wang Congkang (born 31 October 1996) is a Chinese canoeist. He competed in the men's K-2 1000 metres event at the 2020 Summer Olympics.

Early life
From an early age Congkang showed talent in his Judo training developing his technique, later scout coach Chen Chunseng would notice said skill and recommend him kayak lessons, as of then he discovered his physique potential and Canoe.

References

External links
 

1996 births
Living people
Chinese male canoeists
Olympic canoeists of China
Canoeists at the 2020 Summer Olympics
Place of birth missing (living people)